Irene Krugman Rudnick (December 27, 1929 – February 2, 2019) was an American politician in the state of South Carolina.

Rudnick served in the South Carolina House of Representatives from 1972 to 1976, 1981 to 1984, and 1987 to 1994 representing Aiken County, South Carolina.

A lawyer, Rudnick was the first Jewish woman to be elected to the South Carolina Legislature.

Background
Rudnick was born in Columbia, South Carolina and graduated from Columbia High School. She received her bachelor's and law degrees from University of South Carolina. While in law school, she was one of the first female members of the South Carolina Law Review. Rudnick practiced law in Aiken, South Carolina, and also taught at USC Aiken. She also taught at an elementary school.

References

1929 births
2019 deaths
People from Aiken, South Carolina
Democratic Party members of the South Carolina House of Representatives
University of South Carolina alumni
University of South Carolina Aiken people
Politicians from Columbia, South Carolina
Women state legislators in South Carolina
Jewish American people in South Carolina politics
Lawyers from Columbia, South Carolina
20th-century American politicians
20th-century American women politicians
20th-century American lawyers
21st-century American Jews
21st-century American women